The Hutton Honors College (or simply Hutton or HHC) is the honors program of Indiana University. The college was founded as the University Honors Division in 1966 with Warner Chapman as its director. It was renamed the Hutton Honors College in the fall of 2004 in honor of IU alumnus Edward L. Hutton. Its purpose serves to bring together students of various disciplines in an intellectually engaging manner, through research, creative projects, seminars, extracurricular activities, rigorous academics, travel abroad, and internships.

Hutton Honors College Students and Alumni have achieved many forms of successes, including:

- Fellowships and scholarships, such as the Churchill Scholarship, the Fulbright Scholarship, the Gates Cambridge Scholarship, the Barry M. Goldwater Scholarship, the Luce Fellowship, the Marshall Scholarship, the Rhodes Scholarship, the Harry S. Truman Scholarship, and many more.

- Graduate degrees at institutions such as Indiana University, UC Berkeley, Harvard, Yale, Princeton, Brown University, Juilliard, Stanford, Columbia University, University of Chicago, Oxford University, etc.

- Careers in corporations and nonprofits which include, Amazon, the American Red Cross, the "Big Four" accounting firms, the U.S. Department of State, Ford Motor Company, Google, IBM, the Peace Corps, Target, and many others.

Timeline
May 1965: The IU Board of Trustees approves “in principle” the establishment of an Honors Division.
1966: The University Honors Division, with Warner Chapman as its director, is established as a unit within the Office for Undergraduate Development. Within a few years, the Honors Division begins to report to the chancellor of the campus. The “first home” of the University Honors Division is Professor Chapman's office, Kirkwood Hall 113.
1973-1986: The University Honors Division is housed in the Student Building.
1984-85: Julia Conaway Bondanella, associate director of the University Honors Division, serves as acting director. Professor Bondanella serves as associate director of the University Honors Division from 1983 to 2000 and associate dean of the IU Honors College 2000–01. She was also elected president of the National Collegiate Honors Council from 1993 to 1994.
Fall 1985: James S. Ackerman, professor of religious studies and former chair of that department, becomes director of the University Honors Division. The first Honors Division merit scholarship recipients matriculate.
Spring 1986: The University Honors Division moves into Haskett House, 324 N. Jordan Ave. A converted garage in Haskett called the Brown County Room serves in the coming years as space to welcome students, faculty, and distinguished campus visitors for extracurricular events.
Early 1990s: The University Honors Division offers its students the opportunity to earn an Honors Notation in recognition of the completion of honors-level coursework in several departments.
Spring 1993: The University Honors Division is given the use of Moody House, 326 N. Jordan Ave., for its advising staff; the offices of other HD administrators remain in 324 N. Jordan Ave.
August 1993: James Ackerman retires; Lewis H. Miller Jr., professor of English and co-founder of the Liberal Arts and Management Program, becomes director of the University Honors Division.
1999: The University Honors Division establishes an Honors Residential Community in Forest Quadrangle.
2000: The University Honors Division becomes the Honors College and Lewis Miller is named dean.
Summer 2002: Edward Gubar, the Honors College director of publications and of grants and a faculty member in the HC and the IU School of Journalism, serves as acting dean.
August 2002: Karen Hanson, chair of the Department of Philosophy and the Rudy Professor of Philosophy, is named dean of the Honors College.
Late Fall 2004: The Honors College is named the Hutton Honors College, in honor of IU alumnus, business leader, and philanthropist Edward L. Hutton.
August 2007: Jean Robinson, professor of political science, serves as interim dean.
July 2008: Matthew Auer is named dean of the HHC.
January 2008: The new  Hutton Honors College building opens, made possible by the generosity of Edward L. Hutton.

Admission and academics

Admission into the prestigious Hutton Honors College requires students to have a minimum HS GPA	of 3.90 (or top 7.5% class rank) and a ≥32 ACT or ≥1390 (OLD SAT CR+M)/ ≥1440 (NEW SAT) OR a minimum HS GPA of 3.85 (or top 10% class rank) and a ≥34 ACT or ≥1470 (OLD SAT CR+M)/ ≥1510 (NEW SAT).

To achieve the Hutton Honors Notation, students must maintain at least a 3.40 GPA for the required 18 credit hours counting towards the Hutton Honors Notation (HHN), with no course grade lower than a C (courses taken satisfactory/fail do not count toward the HHN), and have a cumulative GPA of at least 3.40 at the time of graduation.

International program

Indiana University's Hutton Honors College is among the first university honors programs to make international experience a central feature of its mission and goals. The aim is to help fund an international experience for all of HHC students. Since 2000, the International Experiences Program has helped subsidize overseas experiences for more than 3,500 students. Recipients have traveled to six continents and more than 85 countries.

Grants
During the 2009–2010 school year, Hutton awarded a total of 326 grants amounting to $334,402.50. HHC provides grants for a range of student endeavors including:
Research Grants 
Research Partnership Awards 
Creative Activity Grants 
Teaching Internship Grants 
Pre-Professional Experience Internship Grants 
Professional Development Internship Grants 
Travel Grants 
Fine Arts Capstone Awards 
IMP Capstone Awards 
HHC Thesis Awards 
Alternative Spring Break Grants

Honors Residential Communities
HRCs are academically oriented living environments that emphasize the learning and social aspects of campus life. Students can take selected HHC courses at the residence center and consult with a peer mentor living nearby.

References

External links
Hutton Honors College

Indiana University Bloomington
Public honors colleges
Educational institutions established in 1966
1966 establishments in Indiana